Dion Jeremy Acoff (born September 23, 1991, in Fontana, California) is an American soccer player who plays as a forward for Union Omaha in USL League One.

Early life and education
Acoff was born on September 23, 1991, in Fontana, California. He attended Damien High School and was named to the 2009 Parade All-America High School Soccer Team. He attended Creighton University in Omaha, Nebraska where he played for the men's soccer team. Between 2009-2011 he appeared in 58 games, scoring 5 goals and assisting on 16 others. Following his junior year, Acoff did not have his scholarship at Creighton renewed.

Acoff looked to return to Southern California and ultimately chose to transfer to the University of California, Santa Barbara. He played in 16 games for the UC Santa Barbara Gauchos men's soccer team for his senior season and scored one goal and three assists.

Career

Professional
Acoff signed for SJK on 15 February 2019. On 21 October 2019, Acoff was released by SJK following the completion of their season along with eight other players.

On 1 June 2020, Acoff returned to the Icelandic club Knattspyrnufélagið Þróttur.

Acoff signed with Grindavík in March 2021 and reunited with his former Valur assistant coach, Sigurbjörn Örn Hreiðarsson.

Acoff signed with Union Omaha in February 2022, reuniting him with head coach Jay Mims, who coached Acoff while he was an assistant coach at Creighton.

Career statistics

Club

Honours
Valur
Úrvalsdeild: 2017, 2018
League Cup: 2018
Icelandic Super Cup: 2017, 2018

References

External links
 Dion Acoff at Union Omaha
 
 
 
 Dion Acoff at UC Santa Barbara Gauchos
 Dion Acoff at Creighton Bluejays

1991 births
Living people
American expatriate soccer players
American soccer players
Association football forwards
Parade High School All-Americans (boys' soccer)
Dion Acoff
Dion Acoff
Seinäjoen Jalkapallokerho players
UC Santa Barbara Gauchos men's soccer players
Veikkausliiga players
Expatriate footballers in Finland
Expatriate footballers in Iceland
American expatriate sportspeople in Finland
American expatriate sportspeople in Iceland